Relay Bike Share is a public bicycle sharing system located in Atlanta, Georgia.

History
Launched in June 2016 by the City of Atlanta, the system runs year-round. Relay Bike Share expanded in November 2016 from 10 to 22 stations and extended the service area to include Midtown Atlanta. In the summer of 2017, three new hubs were launched in Buckhead. 

, there were over 500 bicycles, and 65 stations within the Atlanta area.

In September 2019, The Atlanta Journal-Constitution reported that Relay rental numbers significantly dropped from 11,000-12,000 rides a month in May to 2018, to 2,321 in August 2019, as other micromobility companies entered Atlanta.

Coverage area and expansion
Most of the stations are in Midtown and Downtown. However in 2017, three new stations were added in Buckhead.

See also 
Cycling in Atlanta
Cycling infrastructure
PATH Foundation

References

External links
 

Community bicycle programs
Cycling in Atlanta
2016 establishments in Georgia (U.S. state)
Transportation in Atlanta
Bicycle sharing in the United States